Jeff Richter is an American music video director and editor. He has worked for Intuitive Entertainment, MTV Networks, Trans-Siberian Orchestra and is the owner of Earthquake Productions, a production company where he directs and edits his own music videos, concert films and commercials.

Select videography

1989
 "Bed of Nails" (directed by Nigel Dick; editor only) - Alice Cooper
1990
 "The More Things Change" - Cinderella
1992
 "Foreclosure of a Dream" - Megadeth
1994
 "Foreign Sand" - Roger Taylor featuring Yoshiki
1996
 "Work It Out" (directed by Nigel Dick; editor only) - Def Leppard
1997
 "Break on Through (To the Other Side)" (version 2) - The Doors
1998
 "Ain't Goin' to Goa" ('98 Radio Remix) - Alabama 3
1999
 "Nobody Can Stop Me" (directed by Gregory Dark; editor only) - Bizzy Bone
 "Blue Monday" (directed by Gregory Dark; editor only) - Orgy
 "Fuck Dying" (directed by Gregory Dark; editor only) - Ice Cube featuring Korn
 "Thug Mentality" (directed by Gregory Dark; editor only) - Krayzie Bone
 "Awful" - Hole
 "Good to Be Alive" (Radio Remix) - DJ Rap
 "Welcome to the Jungle" (Live) - Guns N' Roses
 "The Anthem" - Sway & King Tech featuring RZA, Tech N9ne, Eminem, Xzibit, Pharoahe Monch, Kool G Rap, Jayo Felony, Chino XL and KRS-One
2000
 "Whoa!" - Black Rob
 "Into the Void" (co-directed with Walter Stern; also editor) - Nine Inch Nails
 "You Sang to Me" (also editor) - Marc Anthony
 "Quality Control" - Jurassic 5
 "Wifey" - Next
 "The Light" - Pharoahe Monch
 "Oooh." - De La Soul featuring Redman
 "Oh No" - Mos Def, Pharoahe Monch and Nate Dogg
 "After Party" - Koffee Brown 
2001
 "W.O.E. Is Me (World of Entertainment)" (uncredited) - Jurassic 5
 "It Don't Matter" - Rehab
 "La Rhumba" - RZA as Bobby Digital featuring Method Man, Killa Sin and Beretta 9
2002
 "The Knoc" - Knoc-turn'al featuring Missy Elliott and Dr. Dre
2003
 "Send the Pain Below" - Chevelle
 "Worms of the Earth" - Finch
 "We Want Peace" - Lenny Kravitz
 "True to Myself" - Ziggy Marley
2004
 "She Bangs" - William Hung
 "Saturday Night" - Ozomatli
2005
 "Comin' to Your City" - Big & Rich
2007
 "Rise Today" (directed by Dale Resteghini; editor only) - Alter Bridge
 "Calling You" (also editor) - Blue October
2014
 "Lose Yourself Avicii and Leehom Wang" (directed by Jeff Richter; director editor) - Avicii

References

External links
 
 Jeff Richter's videography
 Earthquake Productions

American editors
American music video directors
Living people
Place of birth missing (living people)
University of Missouri alumni
Year of birth missing (living people)